The New York Clan MacDonald were a Scottish American professional soccer club.  They spent several seasons in both the National Association Football League and New York State Football Association.

History
In 1907, Clan MacDonald joined the National Association Football League (NAFBL).  They finished sixth and withdrew from the NAFBL, joining the New York State Football Association (NYSFA).  The NYSFA was broken into a Saturday and Sunday league.  The Clan MacDonald won the Sunday league, but lost to Hollywood Inn F.C. of the Saturday league in the championship game.  In 1913, they rejoined the NAFBL, playing through the end of the 1914-1915 season.  While they registered with the league prior to the 1915-1916 season, they withdrew before the first game of the season.  In 1913, Clan MacDonald went to the semifinals of the American Amateur Football Association Cup.

Year-by-year

Honors
League Championship
 Runner Up (4): 1909, 1911, 1912, 1917

New York State Cup
 Runner Up (1): 1911

References

External links
 National Association Football League standings

Defunct soccer clubs in New York (state)
National Association Football League teams
Men's soccer clubs in New York (state)
Association football clubs disestablished in the 20th century